Cătălin Ciprian Vraciu (born 21 January 1989) is a Romanian footballer who plays as a forward or midfielder for Aerostar Bacău.

Club career
He made his debut on the professional league level in the Liga I for Botoșani on 21 July 2013 as a starter in a game against CFR Cluj.

Honours

FCM Bacău
Liga III: 2010–11

FC Botoșani
Liga II: 2012–13

Aerostar Bacău
Liga III: 2017–18, 2019–20

References

External links
 
 

Living people
1989 births
Romanian footballers
Association football forwards
Liga I players
Liga II players
FCM Bacău players
FC Botoșani players
FCM Dunărea Galați players
ACS Poli Timișoara players
ACS Foresta Suceava players
CS Aerostar Bacău players
Sportspeople from Bacău